Avirex  is an American company that designs, manufactures and markets clothing lines. It was founded by Jeff Clyman in 1975 as a brand for military apparel. Contrary to popular belief, Avirex was not a U.S. military supplier during World War II. In 1987 the company worked on re-issuing of A-2 jacket for the United States Air Force.

In 2006, Jeff Clyman sold the Avirex brand and trademark as well as the Avirex sportswear and hip-hop fashion lines in Europe, Japan, and the United States. The new owner of the US Avirex brand in the United States is Centric Brands.

See also
Alpha Industries
Schott NYC
Al Wissam

References

External links
Avirex USA
Avirex USA UK & Europe
Avirex EUROPE
Former Website
Avirex Japan
Avirex, Japan
Bags Avirex Official Website

Clothing brands of the United States
Clothing companies established in 1975
Companies that filed for Chapter 11 bankruptcy in 2020